Peru Time (PET) is the official time in Peru.  It is always 5 hours behind Coordinated Universal Time (UTC−05:00). Peru has only one time zone and does not observe daylight saving time.  During the winter (summer in the Northern Hemisphere), Peruvian Time is the same as North American Central Time, while during the summer (winter in the Northern Hemisphere) it is the same as Eastern Time.

IANA time zone database
In the IANA time zone database Peru has the following time zone:
America/Lima (PE)

References

External links
GMT: Greenwich Mean Time - World Time / Time in every Time Zone